Peak School is a coeducational preparatory school, located on Plunkett's Road on Victoria Peak, Hong Kong Island, Hong Kong. The school is one of around twenty institutions in Hong Kong operated by the English Schools Foundation (ESF).

The school opened in 1911, on the site of what is now the Victoria Peak Fire Station. In 1954, the school moved to its current premises located on Plunkett's Road.

Peak School teaches students from Year One to Year Six, and offers the International Baccalaureate programme. The principal of Peak School is Bill Garnett.

Accreditations and Authorizations 
The Peak School is accredited, authorized, or a member of the following organizations:
 Western Association of Schools and Colleges (WASC)
 Council of International Schools (CIS)
 The International Baccalaureate Primary Years Program

Notable alumni
Jack Avon, financial modelling expert
Martin Booth, British novelist and poet
Marie-Chantal, Crown Princess of Greece, Greek and Danish princess
Sara Jane Ho, etiquette teacher
Eleanor Sanger, American sports producer
Hannah Wilson, Hong Kong swimmer
Sir Denis Wright, British diplomat

References

External links

Peak School website

Primary schools in Hong Kong
English Schools Foundation schools
1911 establishments in Hong Kong
International Baccalaureate schools in Hong Kong
Victoria Peak